Teresita is an unincorporated community in western Shannon County, Missouri, United States. It is located just off U.S. Route 60, approximately six miles east of Mountain View.

A post office called Teresita was established in 1903, and remained in operation until 1990. It is unknown why the Spanish name "Teresita" was applied to this community.

References

Unincorporated communities in Shannon County, Missouri
Populated places established in 1904
Unincorporated communities in Missouri